Szabolcs Izsák (3 April 1944 – 6 July 1993) was a Hungarian sailor. He competed at the 1968 Summer Olympics and the 1972 Summer Olympics.

References

External links
 

1944 births
1993 deaths
Hungarian male sailors (sport)
Olympic sailors of Hungary
Sailors at the 1968 Summer Olympics – Flying Dutchman
Sailors at the 1972 Summer Olympics – Flying Dutchman
Sportspeople from Budapest
20th-century Hungarian people